Richard Garrett may refer to:
Richard Garrett (author) (born 1920), English author, prisoner of war
Richard Garrett (1755–1839), agricultural machinery manufacturer, founder of Richard Garrett & Sons, Leiston, Suffolk
Richard Garrett (1779–1837), his son
Richard Garrett (1807–1866), his son, steam engine manufacturer
Dickie Garrett (1865–1908), Wales international rugby player
Richard Garrett (1806–1878), owned the property on which the presidential assassin, John Wilkes Booth was cornered and killed

See also
Dick Garrett, American basketball player
Garrett Richards (born 1988), American baseball pitcher